Matthew John Cahill (born 6 August 2000) is an Australian professional soccer player who currently plays as a forward for National Premier Leagues NSW club North West Sydney Spirit.

Career statistics

Club

Notes

References

External links
 Matthew Cahill at HKFA
 Matthew Cahill at the University of Wisconsin–Milwaukee

2000 births
Living people
University of Wisconsin–Milwaukee alumni
Australian soccer players
Australian expatriate soccer players
Association football forwards
Newcastle Jets FC players
Central Coast Mariners FC players
Southern District FC players
Hong Kong Premier League players
Australian expatriate sportspeople in the United States
Australian expatriate sportspeople in Hong Kong
Expatriate soccer players in the United States
Expatriate footballers in Hong Kong
Milwaukee Panthers men's soccer players
APIA Leichhardt FC players